John Idwal Rees (25 July 1910 – 31 August 1991) was a Welsh international rugby union centre who played club rugby for Swansea and Cambridge University. He was capped 14 times for Wales captaining the team on two occasions.

Personal history
Rees was born in Swansea, south Wales in 1910. He was educated at Swansea Grammar School before matriculating to Swansea University at the age of 17. In October 1931 he gained a place at Cambridge University, and from there obtained a job teaching at Fettes College. In 1938 he returned to Wales becoming headmaster of Cowbridge Grammar School, a role he held until his retirement in 1971. Rees also released a book, Rugger Practice and Tactics, co-authored with H. F. Macdonald.

Rugby career
Rees first played rugby for Swansea Grammar School, but when he graduated to Swansea University at the age of 17, he gave up rugby as he believed he was too light to play. In 1928/29 season he joined Swansea University RFC, playing alongside future Welsh internationals, Watcyn Thomas and Claude Davey. Rees played for Swansea in the 1929/30 season, moving from scrum-half to full-back to centre; but in October 1931 he went to Cambridge where he achieved his rugby 'blue' in 1931 and 1932.

When Rees obtained a job at Fettes College he played for Edinburgh Wanderers, but during the school holidays he returned to Wales, playing for Swansea.

International matches played
Wales
  1934, 1936, 1937, 1938
  1934, 1936, 1937, 1938
  1935
  1934, 1935, 1936, 1937, 1938

Bibliography

References

1910 births
1991 deaths
Welsh rugby union players
Wales international rugby union players
Wales rugby union captains
Rugby union players from Swansea
Cambridge University R.U.F.C. players
Barbarian F.C. players
Swansea RFC players
London Welsh RFC players
People educated at Bishop Gore School
Rugby union centres